The Ambassador's Daughter is the title of two movies:

The Ambassador's Daughter (1913 film), a short film starring Miriam Nesbitt, George Lessey and Robert Brower, directed by Charles Brabin
The Ambassador's Daughter (1956 film), featuring Olivia de Havilland and John Forsythe